Border Village  is a settlement located in South Australia within the locality of Nullarbor on the Eyre Highway at the border with Western Australia.

The settlement, which is 12 km east of Eucla, was named in 1993 by the South Australian Geographical Names Advisory Committee following a suggestion provided by the Royal Automobile Club of Western Australia.

As of 2004, the settlement offered services to travellers and visitors to Nullarbor including:Motel, cabin and caravan accommodation, a restaurant which opens from 6.00:00 - 10.12:00, a takeaway service which is open from 6.00:00 - 11.12:00, full garage service and a desalination plant which provides fresh water.

There is a Western Australian agricultural checkpoint at Border Village, and also "Hole 6: Border Kangaroo" of the Nullarbor Links golf course.

The settlement is one of five that uses the Central Western Standard Time (UTC+08:45). It is also the only place in South Australia where Daylight Saving Time is not in use.

See also
 List of cities and towns in South Australia

Notes

External links

Towns in South Australia
Nullarbor Plain
Places in the unincorporated areas of South Australia
Eyre Highway